Hagudi is a village in Rapla Parish, Rapla County in northwestern Estonia. As of 2011 Census, the settlement's population was 95.

References

Villages in Rapla County